The Africa Progress Panel was a Swiss-based foundation that aimed to bring about policy change through analysis, advocacy and diplomacy.

The panel was chaired by former United Nations Secretary-General Kofi Annan and during its existence consisted of the following members:
 Tony Blair - Former Prime Minister of United Kingdom.
 Michel Camdessus - Former Managing Director of the International Monetary Fund.
 Peter Eigen - Founder and Chair of the Advisory Council, Transparency International and Chairman of the Extractive Industries Transparency Initiative.
 Bob Geldof - Musician, Businessman, Founder and Chair of Band Aid, Live Aid and Live 8, Co-founder of DATA and ONE.
 Graça Machel - President of the Foundation for Community Development and founder of New Faces New Voices.
 Strive Masiyiwa - Founder of Econet Wireless.
 Linah Mohohlo - Governor, Bank of Botswana.
 Olusegun Obasanjo - former President of Nigeria.
 Robert Rubin - Co-Chairman of the Board, Council on Foreign Relations and former Secretary of the United States Treasury.
 Tidjane Thiam - Chief Executive Officer, Crédit Suisse.

Timeline

The Africa Progress Panel sought to influence policy through robust, evidence-based analysis in the annual Africa Progress Reports, the Panel members’ high-level access and communications work.

History
In the wake of the Gleneagles G8 Summit in 2005 and the Commission for Africa Report in 2007, the Africa Progress Panel was originally formed through a UK Government initiative as a vehicle to maintain focus on commitments made to Africa by the International Community. As such, the Africa Progress Panel's work centres on complex and high-impact issues that are particularly relevant to Africa.

Following the publication of the final report, the Panel reported that it had ceased its operations at the end of 2017.

The Secretariat

The Geneva-based secretariat was a non-profit foundation under Swiss law. The Panel's work was supported by a secretariat, established in 2008 and headed by Executive Director: Michael Keatin (2009-2010), Dawde Jobarteh (Acting 2011-12), Caroline Kende-Robb (2012-2016) and Maximillian Jarett (2017).

Publications

The Africa Progress Report 
Published annually, the Africa Progress Reports were the flagship publications of the Africa Progress Panel.

Africa Progress Report 2015—Power, People, Planet: Seizing Africa’s Energy and Climate Opportunities

Demand for modern energy in Sub-Saharan Africa is set to surge, fuelled by economic growth, demographic change and urbanisation. As the costs of low-carbon energy fall, Africa could leapfrog into a new era of power generation. Utility reform, new technologies and new business models could be as transformative in energy as the mobile phone has been in telecommunications. The Africa Progress Report 2015 explains the bold steps that leaders globally and in Africa must take to achieve this vision. Above all, the report shows that the global climate moment is also Africa's moment to lead the world.

The 2015 Africa Progress Report was launched in Cape Town, South Africa on 5 June 2015 by Executive Director Caroline Kende-Robb and Panel Members Graça Machel, Linah Mohohlo, and Michel Camdessus.

Africa Progress Report 2014—Grain, Fish, Money: Financing Africa’s Green and Blue Revolutions

To sustain growth that improves the lives of all Africans, the continent needs an economic transformation that taps into Africa's other riches: its fertile land, its extensive fisheries and forests, and the energy and ingenuity of its people. To achieve such a transformation, Africa will need to overcome three major obstacles: a lack of access to formal financial services, the weakness of the continent's infrastructure and the lack of funds for public investment. The Africa Progress Report 2014 describes how African governments and their international partners can cooperate to remove those obstacles – and enable all Africans to benefit from their continent's extraordinary wealth.

The 2012 Africa Progress Report was launched in London, United Kingdom on 8 May 2014 by Kofi Annan, Tidjane Thiam, Bob Geldof, Peter Eigen and Caroline Kende-Robb.

Africa Progress Report 2013 – Equity in Extractives: Stewarding Africa’s Natural Resources for All

In 2013, Africa's economies were riding the crest of a global commodity wave that had the potential to transform the continent's prospects. The 2013 Africa Progress Report explains how this unprecedented chance might lift millions out of poverty, and improve the prospects of generations to come, by strengthening fiscal policy and increasing equitable public spending on infrastructure, health, education, water and sanitation.

The 2013 Africa Progress Report was launched at the World Economic Forum on Africa in Cape Town, South Africa on 8 June 2013 by Kofi Annan, Linah Mohohlo, and Strive Masiyiwa.[9] The report's hard-hitting findings and policy recommendations received substantial international attention.

Africa Progress Report 2012 - Jobs, Justice and Equity: Seizing Opportunities in Times of Global Change

The 2012 Africa Progress Report looks at three of the most critical ingredients for transforming a promising economic upturn into a sustained recovery and lasting human development – jobs, justice and equity. The report explores the fundamental role jobs play in African's life-chances, and hones in on how, over the long run, issues of injustice and inequality can undermine long-term economic growth, productivity and the development of markets.

The launch of the 2012 Africa Progress Report was covered by international news publications, including The Wall Street Journal,[10] The Guardian,[11] The Financial Times,[12]  and the African Business Magazine ran a cover story based on the report.[13]As part of the launch, Executive Director Caroline Kende-Robb and Panel Member Olusegun Obasanjo were interviewed for the video series This Is Africa.[14]

Africa Progress Report 2011 - The Transformative Power of Partnerships

Africa Progress Report 2010 - From Agenda to Action: Turning Resources into Results for People

Africa Progress Report 2009 - An Agenda for Progress at a Time of Global Crisis: A Call for African Leadership

External links
Africa Progress Panel Website
Africa Progress Panel Facebook
Africa Progress Panel Twitter
Kofi Annan Foundation

References 

Foundations based in Switzerland
International development in Africa
Organizations established in 2007